Benville is an unincorporated community in Brown County, Illinois, United States. Benville is southeast of Siloam Springs State Park.

The community is named after Ben Akright, who had a general store in the area in the 1850s.

References

Unincorporated communities in Brown County, Illinois
Unincorporated communities in Illinois